Jin Seo-yeon ( born on 18 January 1983) is a South Korean actress. She made her acting debut in 2007 in film Eve's Temptation - Good Wife, since then, she has appeared in number of films and television series. She got recognition for her supporting roles in Manny (2011), Passionate Love (2013), Tell Me What You Saw (2020) and One the Woman (2021). She has acted in films such as: Romantic Island (2008) and Believer (2018), for which she won two Best Supporting Actress awards and five nominations in seven different award ceremonies.

Career
Jin Seo-yeon studied at Dongduk Women's University for her graduation in Broadcasting and Entertainment. She debuted in the 2007 film Eve’s Love- Good Wife and drama series Medical Gibang Cinema aired on OCN.

In 2018, she appeared in film Believer as Bo-ryeong, portraying Chinese-Korean drug lord's eccentric girl friend, for which she won two Best Supporting Actress awards and five nominations in seven different award ceremonies.

In 2021, she was cast in SBS TV series One the Woman as Han Seong-hye, a talented businesswoman  of Hanju Group. Her portrayal won her Excellence Award, Actress in a Miniseries at 2021 SBS Drama Awards.

Filmography

Films

Television series

Musical video appearances

Theater

Awards and nominations

References

External links

 
 
 Jin Seo-yeon on Daum 
 Jin Seo-yeon on KMDb 
 Jin Seo-yeon on Play DB

21st-century South Korean actresses
South Korean film actresses
South Korean television actresses
South Korean stage actresses
Living people
1983 births
Dongduk Women's University alumni
Best Supporting Actress Grand Bell Awards winners